The XXXIII Golden Grand Prix Ivan Yarygin 2022, also known as Ivan Yarygin (Yariguin) 2022 is a United World Wrestling freestyle wrestling international tournament, which was held in Krasnoyarsk, Russia between 27 and 30 January 2022.

Event videos
The event was air freely on the wrestlingtv.ru channel.

Medal table

Medal overview

Men's freestyle

Women's freestyle

Participating nations
341 competitors from 11 nations participated.

 (2)
 (3)
 (14)
 (3)
 (30)
 (15)
 (3)
 (37)
 (220)
 (1)
 (13)

References

External links 
Official website

Golden Grand Prix Ivan Yarygin
Golden Grand Prix Ivan Yarygin
2022 in sport wrestling
January 2022 sports events in Russia